The Agnes Fay Morgan Research Award was established in 1951 by the Iota Sigma Pi honorary society for women in chemistry. The award is given for research achievement in chemistry or biochemistry to a woman not over forty years of age at the time of her nomination. Individual chapters, Iota Sigma Pi members, chemists, and groups of chemists may nominate eligible chemists for the prize.

The award was named for Agnes Fay Morgan (1884–1968), biochemist and nutritionist, born in Peoria, Illinois, USA. She studied at the University of Chicago (BS, MS, PhD), and taught at the University of California, Berkeley (1915–54), where she helped organize (1919) what was to become a nationally outstanding home economics department. A founder of the science of nutrition, her research focused on the analysis of nutrients in foods, the stability of vitamins and proteins during food processing, and the physiological effects of vitamin deficiencies. Especially noteworthy was her discovery of the role of pantothenic acid in adrenal function and pigmentation. Her work for government and private agencies included the development of improved methods of dehydrating foods.

Award recipients
Source: Iota Sigma Pi

See also

 List of chemistry awards
List of science and technology awards for women

References

Awards established in 1951
Chemistry awards
Science awards honoring women
Early career awards